Misbehaviour is a 2020 British comedy-drama film directed by Philippa Lowthorpe, from a screenplay by Gaby Chiappe and Rebecca Frayn, from a story by Frayn. The film stars Keira Knightley, Gugu Mbatha-Raw, Jessie Buckley, Keeley Hawes, Phyllis Logan, Lesley Manville, Rhys Ifans and Greg Kinnear.

Misbehaviour was released in the United Kingdom on 13 March 2020 by Pathé's distribution partner 20th Century Fox. It is the final film from Pathé UK to be released under the 20th Century Fox name.

Premise 
The 1970 Miss World competition took place in London, hosted by the American comedian Bob Hope. At that time Miss World was the most-watched TV show in the world with over 100 million viewers. Arguing that beauty competitions objectify women, the newly formed women's liberation movement achieved overnight fame by invading the stage and disrupting the live broadcast of the competition. When the show resumed, the result caused uproar: the winner was not the Swedish favourite but Miss Grenada, the second (after Carole Crawford of Jamaica) black woman to be crowned Miss World.

Cast

Production 
The film was announced in October 2018, with Keira Knightley, Gugu Mbatha-Raw and Jessie Buckley set to star. Philippa Lowthorpe was set to direct. In November 2018, Lesley Manville, Greg Kinnear,  Keeley Hawes, Rhys Ifans and Phyllis Logan had joined the cast of the film. In September 2018 Collet Collins joined the cast, and in January 2019 Suki Waterhouse and Clara Rosager joined.

Filming 
Principal photography began in November 2018. Filming in the Crofton Park area of Lewisham in southeast London occurred in early January 2019.

Release 
The film was released in the United Kingdom on 13 March 2020. Shout Studios was named as the distributor in the United States. Due to the COVID-19 pandemic, the film's theatrical release was cut short, and the film was released early to video on demand in the United Kingdom on 15 April.

The movie was released on DVD in the United Kingdom by Walt Disney Studios Home Entertainment on 7 September 2020. As of 2021, Warner Bros. Home Entertainment was re-printing under licence from Pathé. 

The film was inspired by an edition of the BBC Radio 4 series The Reunion, broadcast in September 2010.

Reception

Box office 
Misbehaviour grossed £347,643 in its opening weekend in the United Kingdom and a total of £455,088 locally and $2,024,073 worldwide.

Critical response 
The site's critics consensus reads: "Misbehaviours overall arc will be familiar to fans of feelgood British cinema – and so will the way it triumphs over formula to tell a thoroughly crowd-pleasing story." On Metacritic, it has a score of 62, based on reviews from 15 critics, indicating "generally favourable reviews."

Richard Roeper wrote, "Following the playbook of 'The Full Monty,' 'Calendar Girls,' 'Military Wives,' et al., 'Misbehaviour' achieves just the right mix of farcical humor, dry wit and the obligatory dramatic moments when the light banter and sight gags give way to Poignant Confrontations reminding us there are serious undertones to this breezy romp."

Sheila O'Malley of RogerEbert.com of the film gave a mixed review. Though O'Malley praised screenwriters Rebecca Frayn and Gaby Chiappe  for focusing on the intersecting stories of both the protesters and pageant competitors, she noted "it's treated as a given that pageants are sexist and gross, [yet] the scenes of pageant rehearsals plus the camaraderie of the contestants tells a different story. The separate storyline structure runs into trouble because these ideas don't have a chance to develop or take root."

References

External links 
 
 

2020 films
British buddy comedy-drama films
Left Bank Pictures films
Pathé films
BBC Film films
20th Century Fox films
Films about beauty pageants
Films set in the 1970s
Films set in 1970
British films based on actual events
Miss World 1970
2020 comedy-drama films
Films shot in London
British female buddy films
2020s feminist films
2020s female buddy films
2020s English-language films
Films directed by Philippa Lowthorpe
2020s British films
2020s French films
2020s buddy comedy-drama films